Jaroslav Starý (born 9 February 1988) is a Czech football player who is currently playing for Vlašim, on loan from 1. FC Slovácko. He started his professional career at Slavia Prague, where he made his Gambrinus liga debut against Teplice on 13 March 2010. He has represented his country at under-18 level.

References

External links
 

Czech footballers
Czech First League players
1988 births
Living people
SK Slavia Prague players
1. FC Slovácko players
FK Viktoria Žižkov players
FC Sellier & Bellot Vlašim players

Association football defenders